Aleksei Andreyevich Yeroshkin (born 20 January 1987) is a former Russian professional football player.

Club career
He played in the Russian Football National League for FC Khimki in 2010.

External links
 
 

1987 births
People from Mytishchi
Living people
Russian footballers
Association football defenders
FC Spartak Moscow players
FC Lukhovitsy players
FC Khimki players
FC Vityaz Podolsk players
FC Nosta Novotroitsk players
Sportspeople from Moscow Oblast